Adeesha Nanayakkara (born 2 May 1991) is a Sri Lankan cricketer. He made his first-class debut for Bloomfield Cricket and Athletic Club in the 2013–14 Premier Trophy on 17 January 2014. Adeesha was educated at Nalanda College, Colombo.

In April 2018, he was named in Kandy's squad for the 2018 Super Provincial One Day Tournament. He was the leading run-scorer for Sri Lanka Ports Authority Cricket Club in the 2018–19 Premier League Tournament, with 650 runs in nine matches.

References

External links
 

1991 births
Living people
Sri Lankan cricketers
Anuradhaura District cricketers
Bloomfield Cricket and Athletic Club cricketers
Sri Lanka Ports Authority Cricket Club cricketers
Tamil Union Cricket and Athletic Club cricketers
Cricketers from Colombo
Alumni of Nalanda College, Colombo